Yvette Nolan (Algonquin) (1961) is a Canadian playwright, director, actor, and educator based out of Saskatchewan, Canada. She was born in Prince Albert, Saskatchewan. She has contributed significantly to the creation and performance of Indigenous theatre in Canada.

Early life

Nolan was born in Prince Albert, Saskatchewan, to an Algonquin mother and an Irish immigrant father. Nolan was raised in Winnipeg, Manitoba and attended the University of Manitoba where she graduated with a B.A.

Nolan's commitment to Indigenous and feminist live art is attributed to the first time she saw a Native character on stage during Royal Winnipeg Ballet's adaptation of The Ecstasy of Rita Joe.

Career

Nolan launched her career as a playwright at the Winnipeg Fringe Festival in 1990 where her play Blade premiered. It was later remounted at both the Best of the Fringe (1990) and Women in View Festival (1992).

She has worked at various theatre companies throughout Canada including Agassiz Theatre, the Manitoba Theatre Centre, Nakai Theatre in Whitehorse, Native Earth Performing Arts.

As a director, Nolan has contributed significantly to the development of Aboriginal theatre. She has directed plays by George Ryga (The Ecstasy of Rita Joe), Turtle Gals Performance Ensemble (The Only Good Indian) and Marie Clements (Tombs of the Vanishing Indian and The Unnatural and Accidental Women),  (Café Daughter and In Care), Melanie J. Murray (A Very Polite Genocide).

From 1998 until 2001, Nolan was also president of the Playwright's Union of Canada (now called the Playwrights Guild of Canada). She was artistic director of Native Earth from 2003 to 2010. She was president of Indigenous Performing Arts Alliance, and has served on the boards of the Saskatchewan Arts Alliance and the Saskatchewan Association of Theatre Professionals. In 2010 and 2011 Nolan was hosted in New Zealand to a Māori theatre festival called the Matariki Development Festival where she contributed as a playwright, director and dramaturg.

Nolan is an Artistic Associate at Signal Theatre and co-director with Michael Greyeyes of a dance opera (Bearing) at the 2017 Luminato Festival. She also directed (Nôhkom) with Signal Theatre.

In 2017 she was awarded an Honorary Lifetime Membership to the 

In 2021 she taught at the Canadian College of the Performing Arts in Victoria, B.C. https://www.ccpacanada.com/personnel/yvette-nolan/

She is currently completing her ongoing work about the role of Boards of Directors in arts organisations as she works towards completing her Masters of Public Policy at the Johnson Shoyama Graduate School of Public Policy at the University of Saskatchewan. https://www.thestar.com/news/insight/2022/03/18/ceos-in-the-green-room-should-arts-groups-be-run-by-corporate-style-boards.html?rf
 
In 2022 she is the Interim Co-Artistic Director along with Skye Brandon at Shakespeare On The Saskatchewan.https://www.shakespearesask.com/blog/blog_detail/a_message_from_cointerim_festival_curators_yvette_nolan_and_skye_brandon

She is a Senior Fellow at Massey College in Toronto.

Writer-in-Residence

Nolan has been a writer-in-residence at several institutions including Brandon University (1996). During this term as writer-in-residence, Nolan wrote Annie Mae's Movement. She was also playwright-in-residence at the National Arts Centre and resident at Mount Royal College in 2009. In 2011 she began a nine-month term as writer-in-residence at the Saskatoon Library and playwright-in-residence at the University of Regina. She was the Writer-in-Residence at McGill University in 2018.  https://www.mcgill.ca/arts/article/mordecai-richler-writer-residence-yvette-nolan

Plays

A Marginal Man
Annie Mae's Movement
Blade
Child
Job's Wife
Shakedown Shakespeare
The Unplugging
Donne In
Owen (radio play)
Toronto Rex
Ham and the Ram
Prophecy
Alaska
from thine eyes
Henry IV Pt 1: (adaptation)
Hilda Blake (libretto)
The Birds: (adaptation)
 Scattering Jake
Finish Line
 Video
 What Befalls The Earth

Editor 
Performing Indigeneity: with Ric Knowles, Playwrights Canada Press, 2016
Beyond The Pale: 
Refractions: Solo with Donna-Michelle St. Bernard, Playwrights Canada Press

Culture Studies
Medicine Shows: Indigenous Performance Culture, Playwrights Canada Press, 2016

Director

 Bearing co-director with Michael Greyeyes, dramaturge, Signal Theatre: Luminato 2017
 Map Of The Land, Map Of The Stars Gwaandak Theatre, 2017
The Piano Teacher Arts Club, Vancouver, BC 2017 
In Care by Kenneth T. Williams, Gordon Tootoosis Nikaniwin Theatre, October 2016 
Café Daughter for Gwaandak Theatre (Yukon) 2011 
Tombs of the Vanishing Indian for Native Earth Performing Arts 2011 
Salt Baby for Native Earth Performing Arts 2009, Globe Theatre, Regina 2016, National tour 2016-2017
The Ecstasy of Rita Joe for National Arts Centre/Western Canada Theatre 2009
A Very Polite Genocide Native Earth Performing Arts 2008
Death of a Chief for Native Earth Performing Arts 2008
The Only Good Indian for Turtle Gals Performance Ensemble 2007
Annie Mae's Movement for Native Earth Performing Arts 2006
Death of a Chief for Native Earth Performing Arts Weesageechak 2005
The Triple Truth for Turtle Gals 2005
The Unnatural and Accidental Women for Native Earth Performing Arts 2004.
The Unplugging at New Native Theatre, Minneapolis 2020 newnativetheatre.org
The Penelopiad Ferre Play Theatre, Persephone Theatre, Saskatoon 2017
Wreckonciliation Amplified Opera, Toronto 2022 https://www.amplifiedopera.com/amplify

Awards

 John Hirsch Award for Most Promising New Writer, 1995.
 James Buller Award for Playwrighting from the Centre for Indigenous Theatre, 1997.
 Maggie Bassett Award for service to the theatre community, 2007.
 City of Toronto's Aboriginal Affairs Award, 2008.
 George Luscombe Award for mentorship in professional theatre, 2008.
 Bob Couchman Award for direction (for Café Daughter by Kenneth T Williams (Gwaandak Theatre)).
 Jessie Richardson Award for Outstanding Original Script, 2013 (for The Unplugging). 
 Mallory Gilbert Leadership Award, 2014. 
 Woman Of Distinction (nomination) - YWCA Saskatoon, 2017

References

1961 births
Canadian women dramatists and playwrights
Algonquin people
Living people
Canadian artistic directors
First Nations dramatists and playwrights
Writers from Prince Albert, Saskatchewan
Canadian theatre directors
First Nations women writers
20th-century Canadian dramatists and playwrights
21st-century Canadian dramatists and playwrights
20th-century Canadian women writers
21st-century Canadian women writers
20th-century First Nations writers
21st-century First Nations writers